"Juke Box Saturday Night" is a song written by Al Stillman and Paul McGrane that was recorded by Glenn Miller in 1942 with vocals by Marion Hutton, Tex Beneke, and The Modernaires.

Cover versions
"Juke Box Saturday Night" was later covered by Nino and the Ebb Tides, whose version charted at #57 on Billboard's Top 100 on September 4, 1961.

References

Songs about jukeboxes
1942 songs
Glenn Miller songs